Arthanarisvarar Temple, Ezhumur, is a Siva temple in Egmore in Chennai in Tamil Nadu (India).

Vaippu Sthalam
It is one of the shrines of the Vaippu Sthalams sung by Tamil Saivite Nayanar Appar.

Presiding deity
The presiding deity is known as Arthanarisvarar Temple. His consort is known as Tiripurasundari.

Shrines
Among others, shrines of Lahshmi Narayana, Durga and  Navagraha are found.

References

External links
 மூவர் தேவார வைப்புத்தலங்கள், ezhumUr, Sl.No.49 of 139 temples
 Shiva Temples, தேவார வைப்புத்தலங்கள், எழுமூர், Sl.No.25 of 133 temples, page1

Hindu temples in Chennai